Thomas Fairley Baird (6 May 1884 – 23 August 1939) was an Australian rules footballer who played with St Kilda in the Victorian Football League (VFL).

Notes

External links 

1884 births
1939 deaths
Australian rules footballers from Geelong
St Kilda Football Club players